Wiktoryn may refer to the following places:
Wiktoryn, Kuyavian-Pomeranian Voivodeship (north-central Poland)
Wiktoryn, Masovian Voivodeship (east-central Poland)
Wiktoryn, Świętokrzyskie Voivodeship (south-central Poland)